Aalto University School of Chemical Engineering is a part of the Aalto University and one of the four new schools of technology established from the former Aalto University School of Science and Technology on 1 January 2011. The new schools continue to offer education and research that promotes advances in science and technology.

The school teaches and researches sustainable processing and use of natural resources, energy technologies, and new materials, and focuses on the development of environmentally-friendly and energy-efficient processes for the refining of wood, other bio-masses, and inorganic raw materials. Additionally, the School develops new materials and their applications based on these raw materials.

The School of Chemical Engineering combines natural sciences and engineering in a unique way. This allows the results of research to be refined a long way and put into practice as ready products and processes. Each innovation secures both our renewable and non-renewable natural resources for the future.

Organization and units

Departments

 Department of Bioproducts and Biosystems 
 Department of Chemical and Metallurgical Engineering 
 Department of Chemistry and Materials Science

Other units

 Bioeconomy Infrastructure
 RawMatTERS Finland Infrastructure (RAMI)

Studies 
The studies and research at the School of Chemical Engineering focus on:

forest industry technology, chemical engineering, industrial biotechnology, materials science and nanotechnology, metal and mineral processing and energy technology. The school offers university degrees in chemical engineering at the bachelor's, master's, licentiate, and doctoral levels.

Bachelor's programmes 
Bachelor's programmes can be studied at the Aalto university School of Chemical Engineering in English and Finnish.

Bachelors Programme in Finnish 
Further information about the Finnish language Bachelor's Programme can be found here https://www.aalto.fi/en/study-options/kemian-tekniikka-tekniikan-kandidaatti-ja-diplomi-insinoori

Master’s Programme in Chemical, Biochemical and Materials Engineering 
The Master’s Programme in Chemical, Biochemical and Materials Engineering has seven majors. When you apply to the Master’s Programme, you apply to one of the majors below:

 Biomass refining
 Biotechnology
 Chemical and Process Engineering
 Chemistry
 Fibre and Polymer Engineering
 Functional Materials
 Sustainable Metals Processing

In all majors in the Master’s Programme in Chemical, Biochemical and Materials Engineering the language of instruction is English. It is also possible to complete some courses in Finnish or Swedish.

You can also accomplish a Master's Degree in a Joint Aalto Master’s Programmes where more than one school is involved or in a Joint international Master's Programme with a European partner university.

Aalto Doctoral Programme in Chemical Engineering 
Further information here: https://www.aalto.fi/en/study-options/aalto-doctoral-programme-in-chemical-engineering

History

Notable alumni

References

External links 
 Aalto University School of Chemical Engineering Official Page

Aalto University